Where Were You When: 1989–1995 is a compilation album by American grindcore band Human Remains. It was released on March 19, 2002 through Relapse Records. The first disc of the album contains all the officially released material, including two 7"s, the Using Sickness as a Hero EP, and a compilation-only track, while the second disc features 18 demo tracks, including previous versions of most tracks on the first disc as well as seven previously unreleased songs.

Critical reception

AllMusic critic William York praised the album, stating: "This is still obviously the CD to buy for anyone interested in Human Remains, and it's also recommended for anyone interested in grindcore or more experimental death metal."

Track listing
Disc one
 "Patterns in the Grass" – 1:44
 "Forked Tongue" – 1:02
 "When Forever Becomes Until" – 2:18
 "Weeding Out the Thorns" – 2:36
 "Waste of Time" – 1:44
 "Rote" – 3:30
 "Chewed Up and Spit Out" – 2:34
 "Swollen" – 3:32
 "Human" – 2:30
 "Beyond Human Perception" – 0:15
 "Spoiling of Beauty" – 3:08
 "Intro/Mechanical" – 4:20
 "Fragrance of Souls" – 3:28
 "Symptoms of the New Society" – 2:38
 "Pretty Build-Up" – 0:37

Disc two
 "Symptoms of the New Society" – 2:17
 "Blessed Paradise" – 2:59
 "The Malignance" – 3:06
 "Human" – 2:56
 "Imagine" – 3:17
 "Chemical Life" – 2:02
 "Fictitiously Vivid" – 2:43
 "Of the Same Flesh" – 3:33
 "Sight Beyond Sickness" – 2:24
 "Human" – 2:37
 "Rote" – 3:36
 "Swollen" – 3:38
 "Mechanical" – 3:19
 "Chewed Up and Spit Out" – 2:47
 "Rote" – 3:31
 "Weeding Out the Thorns" – 2:44
 "Swollen" – 3:34
 "Human" – 2:35

Personnel
 Paul Miller – vocals
 Steve Procopio – guitar
 Jim Baglino – guitar
 Teddy Patterson III – bass
 William Carl Black – bass
 Dave Witte – drums

References

External links

2002 albums
Human Remains albums
Death metal compilation albums
Relapse Records compilation albums